Makoto Uehara (born November 14, 1984) is a Japanese Shidokan Karateka and heavyweight kickboxer competing in K-1. He is the former RISE Heavyweight and Light Heavyweight champion.

Biography and career 
He faced Hiromi Amada at the K-1 World Grand Prix 2012 in Tokyo Final 16 on October 14, 2012 and won via unanimous decision.

Despite qualifying for the K-1 World Grand Prix 2012 Final, Uehara was left out in the cold when the event rolled around and was replaced by the higher-ranked Pavel Zhuravlev.

Uehara defeated Kengo Shimizu by way of split decision at RISE 92 in Tokyo on March 17, 2013 to win the RISE 90 kg title.

He was set to fight Dustin Jacoby at Glory 12: New York - Lightweight World Championship Tournament in New York City on November 23, 2013 but the match was switched to Glory 13: Tokyo - Welterweight World Championship Tournament in Tokyo, Japan on December 21, 2013. He defeated Jacoby by split decision.

Titles
 2013 RISE 90 kg champion
 2011 RISE Heavyweight Tournament runner up
 2011 RISE Heavyweight champion
 31st Shidokan Karate Strong Open Tournament champion

Kickboxing record

|-
|- bgcolor="#FFBBBB"
| 2018-09-24 || Loss|| align=left| Boubaker El Bakouri || K-1 World GP 2018: inaugural Cruiserweight Championship Tournament, Quarter Finals || Japan || KO (Left Jab) || 1 || 1:05|| 23-9-1
|-
|- bgcolor="#FFBBBB"
| 2018-06-17 || Loss|| align=left| Hisaki Kato|| K-1 World GP 2018: 2nd Featherweight Championship Tournament || Saitama, Japan || Extra Round Decision (Split) || 4 || 3:00|| 23-8-1
|-
|- bgcolor="#FFBBBB"
| 2017-11-23 || Loss ||align=left| Antonio Plazibat  || K-1 World GP 2017 Heavyweight Championship Tournament, Semi Finals || Saitama, Japan || KO (Flying Knee) || 1 ||  ||21-7-1
|-
|- bgcolor="#CCFFCC"
| 2017-11-23 || Win ||align=left| Pacome Assi  || K-1 World GP 2017 Heavyweight Championship Tournament, Quarter Finals || Saitama, Japan || KO (Left Uppercut) || 1 || 2:30 ||21-6-1
|-
|- bgcolor="#FFBBBB"
| 2017-02-26 || Loss ||align=left| Ibrahim El Bouni  || K-1 World GP 2017 Lightweight Championship Tournament || Tokyo, Japan || KO (Left hook) || 2 || || 20-6-1
|-
|- bgcolor="#CCFFCC"
| 2016-09-19 || Win ||align=left| Koichi  || K-1 World GP 2016 -60kg World Tournament || Tokyo, Japan || Decision (Unanimous) || 3 || 3:00|| 20-5-1
|-
|-  bgcolor="#CCFFCC"
| 2016-06-24 || Win ||align=left| Tsutomu Takahagi || K-1 World GP 2016 -65kg World Tournament || Tokyo, Japan || TKO (Strikes) || 1 || 0:32 || 19-5-1
|-
|-
|-  bgcolor="#CCFFCC"
| 2016-03-04 || Win ||align=left| Nori || K-1 World GP 2016 -65kg Japan Tournament || Tokyo, Japan || KO (Strikes) || 1 || 2:06 || 18-5-1
|-
|-  bgcolor="#ffbbbb"
| 2014-12-29 || Loss ||align=left| Zabit Samedov || Blade 1 || Tokyo, Japan || Extra Round Decision  || 4  || 3:00 || 17-5-1
|-  
|-  bgcolor="#CCFFCC"
| 2014-07-12 || Win ||align=left| Zelg Galešić || RISE 100  || Tokyo, Japan || KO (Right Hook) || 1 || 1:25 || 17-4-1
|- 
|-  bgcolor="#CCFFCC"
| 2013-12-21 || Win ||align=left| Dustin Jacoby || Glory 13: Tokyo || Tokyo, Japan || Decision (Split) || 3 || 3:00 || 16-4-1
|-   
|-  bgcolor="#c5d2ea"
| 2013-09-13 || Draw ||align=left| Kim Nae Chul || RISE 95  || Tokyo, Japan || Draw (Majority) || 4 || 3:00 || 15-4-1
|- 
|-  bgcolor="#CCFFCC"
| 2013-03-17 || Win ||align=left| Kengo Shimizu || RISE 92 || Tokyo, Japan || Decision (Split) || 3 || 3:00 || 15-4   
|-   
! style=background:white colspan=9 |   
|- 
|-  bgcolor="#CCFFCC" 
| 2012-10-14 || Win ||align=left| Hiromi Amada || K-1 World Grand Prix 2012 in Tokyo Final 16, First Round || Tokyo, Japan || Decision (Unanimous) || 3 || 3:00 || 14-4
|-  bgcolor="#CCFFCC"   
| 2012-06-02 || Win ||align=left| Crafton Wallace || RISE 88 || Tokyo, Japan || TKO (Strikes) || 2 || 2:27 || 13-4   
|-  bgcolor="#ffbbbb" 
|-  bgcolor="#CCFFCC"   
| 2012-03-23 || Win ||align=left| Won Jingan || RISE 87 || Tokyo, Japan || KO (Right Low Kick || 1 || 0:22 || 12-4   
|-  bgcolor="#ffbbbb"   
| 2011-11-23 || Loss ||align=left| Singh Jaideep || RISE 85: Heavyweight Tournament 2011, Final || Tokyo, Japan || KO (Strikes) || 1 || 0:38 || 11-4   
|-   
! style=background:white colspan=9 |   
|-   
|-  bgcolor="#CCFFCC"   
| 2011-11-23 || Win ||align=left| Jan Soukup || RISE 85: Heavyweight Tournament 2011, Semi Finals || Tokyo, Japan || Ext. R Decision (Unanimous) || 4 || 3:00 || 11-3   
|-  bgcolor="#CCFFCC"   
| 2011-11-23 || Win ||align=left| Stefan Leko || RISE 85: Heavyweight Tournament 2011, Quarter Finals || Tokyo, Japan || Decision (Unanimous) || 3 || 3:00 || 10-3
|-  bgcolor="#CCFFCC"
| 2011-07-23 || Win ||align=left| Raoumaru || RISE 80 || Tokyo, Japan || KO (Right Hook) || 2 || 2:42 || 9-3
|-
! style=background:white colspan=9 |
|-
|-  bgcolor="#CCFFCC"
| 2011-02-27 || Win ||align=left| Igifan || RISE 74 || Tokyo, Japan || KO (Right Low Kick) || 1 || 2:14 || 8-3
|-  bgcolor="#CCFFCC"
| 2010-12-19 || Win ||align=left| Raoumaru || RISE 73 || Tokyo, Japan || Decision (Majority) || 3 || 3:00 || 7-3
|-  bgcolor="#CCFFCC"
| 2010-07-31 || Win ||align=left| Kengo Shimizu || RISE 68 || Tokyo, Japan || KO (Left High Kick) || 3 || 1:24 || 6-3
|-  bgcolor="#ffbbbb"
| 2010-04-03 || Loss ||align=left| Tsutomu Takahagi || K-1 World Grand Prix 2010 in Yokohama || Yokohama, Japan || Decision (Majority) || 3 || 3:00 || 5-3
|-  bgcolor="#ffbbbb"
| 2009-12-05 || Loss ||align=left| Singh Jaideep || K-1 World Grand Prix 2009 Final || Yokohama, Japan || KO (Right Hook) || 2 || 1:36 || 5-2
|-  bgcolor="#ffbbbb"
| 2009-07-18 || Loss ||align=left| Hiromi Amada || Heat 10 || Japan || Decision (Unanimous) || 3 || 3:00 || 5-1
|-  bgcolor="#CCFFCC"
| 2009-03-28 || Win ||align=left| Takeshi Onda || Heat 9 || Japan || KO (Left Hook) || Ex. R || N/A || 5-0
|-  bgcolor="#CCFFCC"
| 2008-12-14 || Win ||align=left| Sunwu || Heat 8 || Japan || TKO (Corner Stoppage) || 2 || 1:10 || 4-0
|-  bgcolor="#CCFFCC"
| 2008-07-13 || Win ||align=left| Yong Soo Park || K-1 World Grand Prix 2008 in Taipei || Taipei, Taiwan || KO (Left Hook) || Ex. R  || 1:26 || 3-0
|-  bgcolor="#CCFFCC"
| 2008-04-20 || Win ||align=left| Hideo Sawada || K-1 League Trial Project || Japan || Decision (Unanimous) || 3 || 3:00 || 2-0
|-  bgcolor="#CCFFCC"
| 2008-01-14 || Win ||align=left| Ryuhei Takahashi ||   || Japan || KO (Strikes) || 2 || 1:26 || 1-0
|-
| colspan=9 | Legend:

See also 
List of male kickboxers
List of K-1 Events

References

External links
Official K-1 website
Makoto Uehara K-1 profile
Makoto Uehara Official Blog

1982 births
Living people
Japanese male kickboxers
Heavyweight kickboxers
People from Tokyo
Shidōkan practitioners
Japanese male karateka